Skins is a British teen drama created by father-and-son television writers Bryan Elsley and Jamie Brittain for Company Pictures. The first series began airing on E4 on 25 January 2007 and ended on 22 March 2007. This series sees the introduction of a new cast; it follows the lives of the first generation of sixth form students Tony Stonem, Michelle Richardson, Sid Jenkins, Cassie Ainsworth, Chris Miles, Jal Fazer, Maxxie Oliver and Anwar Kharral.

Cast

Main

Recurring
 Siwan Morris as Angie (5 episodes and 3 uncredited appearances)
 Kaya Scodelario as Effy Stonem (4 episodes)
 Georgina Moffat as Abigail Stock (4 episodes)
 Daniel Kaluuya as Posh Kenneth (4 episodes)
 Stephen Walters as Mad Twatter (3 episodes)
 Robert Wilfort as Tom (3 episodes) 
 Morwenna Banks as Anthea Stonem (2 episodes)
 Harry Enfield as Jim Stonem (2 episodes)
 Arabella Weir as Anna Richardson (2 episodes)
 Danny Dyer as Malcolm (2 episodes)
 Peter Capaldi as Mark Jenkins (2 episodes and 1 uncredited appearance)
 Ben Lloyd-Hughes as Josh Stock (2 episodes)
 Danielle Jadelyn as Water Bottle Girl (2 episodes)
 Victoria Wicks as College Director (1 episode)
 Giles Thomas as Doug (1 episode)

List of episodes

References

External links
List of 

2007 British television seasons
Series 01

de:Liste der Skins-Episoden